Allessandro Masnago (Active ca. 1560 – died 1620) was an Italian jewelry maker, sculptor and miniaturist. Masnago has been described by art historians as a "great virtuoso." He was the son of Italian engraver Giovanni Antonio.

Notable collections

Pendant with Cameo showing Orpheus and the Animals, Art Institute of Chicago 
Sleeping Shepherdess in a Moonlit Landscape, Metropolitan Museum of Art

Further reading

McCrory, Martha. "Cameos and Intaglios." Art Institute of Chicago Museum Studies. Vol. 25, No. 2, Renaissance Jewelry in the Alsdorf Collection (2000), pp. 55–67+105-106

References

16th-century Italian sculptors
Italian male sculptors
17th-century Italian sculptors
Italian jewellery designers